Sex Love & Reggae is the fourth album by Jamaican reggae singer Gyptian. The album was released on 25 October 2013.

Singles

 "Wine Slow" was released as the first single off the album in February 2013.
 "Non Stop" was released as the second single off the album on May 10, 2013.
 "Vixen" was released as the third single off the album on October 24, 2013.
 "Wet Fete" was released as the fourth single off the album on March 24, 2014.

Track listing

Charts

References

Gyptian albums
2013 albums
VP Records albums